Khushboo is an Indian name which means fragrance.

Film and television
 Khushboo (1954 film), a 1954 Bollywood film
 Khushboo (1975 film), an Indian, Hindi-language film directed by Gulzar

 Khushboo (2008 film), a 2008 Hindi film, produced by Pahlaj Nihalani
 Khushboo Ka Ghar, a Pakistani sitcom

People
 Khushboo (Pakistani actress) (born 1969), Pakistani actress
 Khushboo Grewal (born 1984), Punjabi actress, VJ and singer from India
 Kushboo Ramnawaj, Mauritian beauty pageant contestant
 Khushbu (born 1970), Indian film and television actress